Felice Andreasi (8 January 1928, in Turin – 25 December 2005, in Cortazzone) was an Italian film, television, and stage actor.  He appeared in over 50 films in Italy between 1972 and 2005.

Biography 
He was considered one of the leading stage actors in comic and satirical theatre in Milan.

Andreasi won a Nastro d'Argento Best supporting Actor award for his role in Bread and Tulips (1999).  He died of Parkinson's disease in 2005.

Partial filmography

 Jus primae noctis (1972) - Frate Puccio
 Fiorina la vacca (1972) - Compare Michelon
 Dentro la casa della vecchia signora (1973)
 Claretta and Ben (1974) - Peppino Lo Taglio
 The Suspect (1975) - Alessandri
 Goodnight, Ladies and Gentlemen (1976) - Valet of Conclave
 Sturmtruppen (1976) - Sergeant
 Luna di miele in tre (1976) - Hotel director
 Come ti rapisco il pupo (1976) - Ispettore Sessa
 Man in a Hurry (1977) - Le réceptionniste de l'hôtel Daniela
 Ecco noi per esempio (1977)
 Io tigro, tu tigri, egli tigra (1978) - Il Generale
 Saxofone (1978) - Dottor Gatullo
 How to Lose a Wife and Find a Lover (1978) - Dottor Rossini
 Le braghe del padrone (1978) - Verzelli
 Geppo il folle (1978)
 Love in First Class (1980) - Oscar Della Rosa
 Nessuno è perfetto (1981) - Enzo
 L'esercito più pazzo del mondo (1981) - Ministro Difensa
 Il sommergibile più pazzo del mondo (1982) - Cristoforo Passero, Il Capitano
 Sturmtruppen 2 (tutti al fronte) (1982)
 Bingo Bongo (1982) - Professor Fprtis
 Petomaniac (1983) - Avv. Mercier
 Mani di fata (1983) - L'ammiraglio
 The Strangeness of Life (1988) - Father of Nora
 The Story of Boys & Girls (1989) - Domenico
 Musica per vecchi animali (1989) - Astice
 Faccia di lepre (1990) - Avv. Del Moro
 Il caso Martello (1991) - Antonio / Sebastiano Martello
 Lettera da Parigi (1992) - Professor
 A Soul Split in Two (1993) - Savino
 Bonus malus (1993) - Padre Marco
 Quando le montagne finiscono (1994) - Father
 Papà dice messa (1996) - Vescovo
 Muzungu (1999) - Father Luca
 Bread and Tulips (2000) - Fermo
 Johnny the Partisan (2000) - Mugnaio
 La regina degli scacchi (2001) - Judge
 Two Friends (2002) - Padrone di casa
 Fortezza Bastiani (2002) - Professore
 La collezione invisibile (2003) - Ottavio
 Ora e per sempre (2004) - Treves

References

External links

1928 births
2005 deaths
Actors from Turin
Italian male film actors
Italian male television actors
Italian male stage actors
Deaths from Parkinson's disease
Neurological disease deaths in Piedmont
Nastro d'Argento winners